In the Name of Buddha is a 2002 satirical drama film directed by Rajesh Touchriver and produced by K. Shanmughathas and Sai George. The film tells the true story of a Sri Lankan Tamil doctor Siva.

After its world premiere at the Oslo International Film Festival, the film proved controversial and garnered critical acclaim for its subject matter. It also won the Best Foreign Film at the Beverly Hills Film Festival and the Audience Award at the Newport Beach Film Festival

Critical reception
 "A Fine Balance" – India Today.  "A Courageous Treatise" – Empire.  "Terrific" – Film Review UK
"Very worthy" – BBCi Films. "Brave film" – The Guardian

References

External links
 
 

2002 films
British drama films
Indian Peace Keeping Force
2000s British films